TC-S 7001 (Azaindole-1) is a drug which acts as a potent and selective inhibitor of the enzyme Rho kinase, with an IC50 of 0.6 nM at ROCK1 and 1.1 nM at ROCK2. It has vasodilatory effects and has been used in research for a variety of applications.

See also 
 Rho kinase inhibitor

References 

Enzyme inhibitors
Pyrrolopyridines
Pyrimidines
Fluoroarenes
Chloroarenes
Aromatic ethers